Timothy Figureido (born January 9, 1973) is a  Bermudian footballer, who currently plays for Robin Hood.

Club career
Figuereido began his career with Somerset Trojans, and played for the team for three years in the Bermudian Premier Division.

Figuereido has been part of the Bermuda Hogges squad in the USL Second Division since the team's inaugural season in 2007, and has been the first choice goalkeeper throughout his three seasons with the team. He returned for a second spell at the club in 2011.

He has been playing and goalkeeper coaching at Robin Hood since 2011.

International career
Figureido represented Bermuda at the 1995 Pan American Games. He made his full debut for Bermuda in a January 1999 friendly match against Antigua and Barbuda and earned a total of 22 caps, scoring no goals. He has represented his country in 6 FIFA World Cup qualification matches. He played in both of Bermuda's qualifying games for the 2006 FIFA World Cup, and in all four of Bermuda's qualifying games for the 2010 FIFA World Cup, including their 3–1 victory over the Cayman Islands on March 30, 2008, and their historic 2–1 victory over Trinidad and Tobago on June 15, 2008.

His final international match was an August 2008 CONCACAF Gold Cup qualification match against the Cayman Islands.

References

External links

1973 births
Living people
Bermudian footballers
Bermuda international footballers
Association football goalkeepers
Bermuda Hogges F.C. players
USL Second Division players
USL League Two players
Pan American Games competitors for Bermuda
Footballers at the 1995 Pan American Games